Dolichyl-diphosphooligosaccharide—protein glycosyltransferase 48 kDa subunit is an enzyme that in humans is encoded by the DDOST gene.

This gene encodes a component of the oligosaccharyltransferase complex which catalyzes the transfer of high-mannose oligosaccharides to asparagine residues on nascent polypeptides in the lumen of the rough endoplasmic reticulum. The protein complex co-purifies with ribosomes. The product of this gene is also implicated in the processing of advanced glycation endproducts (AGEs), which form from non-enzymatic reactions between sugars and proteins or lipids and are associated with aging and hyperglycemia.

References

Further reading